Belcher's Bar is a hamlet in Leicestershire, England.

Belcher's Bar is located at the junction of the A447 and B582 roads in the parish of Nailstone.

Hamlets in Leicestershire
Hinckley and Bosworth